The Park Avenue Christian Church is located at 1010 Park Avenue at 85th Street, on the Upper East Side of Manhattan. The building houses the Park Avenue Christian Church (The Park) congregation of the Disciples of Christ and United Church of Christ. It also shares its facilities and cosponsors interfaith events with the Reform Temple of Universal Judaism (TUJ), also known as Congregation Da'at Elohim. The Rev. Kaji S. Douša has served as Senior Pastor since 2016. She is the first woman and the first Black woman to be called to this role, the second African-American after the Rev. Alvin Jackson, Pastor Emeritus.

Architecture
In 1911, the original owners, the South Dutch Reformed Church, commissioned the firm of Cram, Goodhue & Ferguson, to design the Park Avenue sanctuary.  Their designer, English architect William Heywood, was clearly inspired by the features of La Sainte-Chapelle in Paris, which were translated into the stately proportions and the slender 70-foot spire (flèche) of its New York counterpart.  Buttresses enabled the building to stand without any steel girding.

The east stained glass window was designed by Louis Comfort Tiffany for the South Reformed Church's previous location at 38th Street and Madison Avenue, then re-installed here.  The other stained glass is the work of Tiffany's one-time employee, artist and businesswoman Mary Elizabeth Tillinghast.

After passing through the hands of the Park Avenue Presbyterian Church, the building was finally acquired in 1945 by the Christian Church.  The original rectory was replaced in 1963 by a much larger five storey facility which in addition to church facilities also houses the church's day school. A 56-rank organ, built by Holtkamp, was installed in 1982.  Major restoration of the sanctuary building was completed in 1993.  The building is an architectural "landmark" of New York City.

History
The Park was formed by nine former members of the Ebenezer Church of New York City in 1810, out of a "fervent desire to embrace a pure and simple understanding of church life as found in the New Testament," part of a wider movement that led to the formation of the Disciples of Christ movement and denomination. Beginning with its participation in the movement to abolish slavery during the 19th century, the Church has espoused an ethical commitment to pursue social justice. One of its current emphases is a commitment to diversity, using the phrase “Divinity of Diversity” as a touchstone statement for this commitment. The Park's commitment to justice includes deconstruction of systems of oppression such as white supremacy, xenophobia, sexism, and includes helping to increase the number of Open and Affirming congregations and to eliminate bias regarding sexual orientation. The congregation continues to be committed to the ecumenical movement for Christian unity, community service, interfaith acceptance, peacemaking and a major involvement in the arts, especially music. Since 1989 the church has sponsored a Saturday Lunch Program for the hungry and/or homeless in its facilities. In 2010, The Park became a dually affiliated congregation not only with the Christian Church (Disciples of Christ), its historic affiliation, but also with the United Church of Christ. In 2016, the park called its first female Senior Minister, The Rev. Kaji Douša.

Temple of Universal Judaism
TUJ was founded in 1974 by Rabbi Roy A. Rosenberg as a haven for interfaith couples and families, while also welcoming Jews from other backgrounds, as well as non-Jews interested in Judaism.  The congregation holds services once a month and on Jewish holidays.  As an example of its efforts to follow the imperative of tikkun olam ("repairing the world") through social action and interfaith cooperation, TUJ holds various events together with The Park, such as the joint annual commemoration in honor of Martin Luther King Jr., and his friend in the civil rights movement, Rabbi Abraham Joshua Heschel.

References

External links
Park Avenue Christian Church homepage
Temple of Universal Judaism homepage

1810 establishments in New York (state)
20th-century Reformed Church in America church buildings
Christian and Jewish interfaith dialogue
Christian Church (Disciples of Christ) congregations
Christian organizations established in 1974
Churches completed in 1911
Churches in Manhattan
Park Avenue
Ralph Adams Cram church buildings
Reform synagogues in New York City
Religious organizations established in 1810
Synagogues in Manhattan
Upper East Side